The Black River is one of the longest rivers in Jamaica. Its name refers to the darkness of the river bed caused by thick layers of decomposing vegetation. Over 100 species of birds have been recorded in the Black River morass.

Sources 

The river's source is the Cockpit Country where it runs underground before emerging north of Siloah on the southern fringe Cockpits.

Route 

Immediately after its emergence, the river meanders gently through the cane fields of the Appleton Estate. It receives a boost from the One Eye River, which is a continuation of the larger Hectors River which forms the Trelawny-Manchester border. Approaching Maggotty, its speed increases and occasional rapids occur.

Passing through Maggotty, the river runs alongside the road and goes down several small waterfalls and the Black River Gorge, located in the Apple Valley Park. Running past Newton, the river flows into the Upper Morass being joined by the Smith River and other smaller tributaries, where thick rushes flourish. In the Elim area, a fish farm cultivates the ‘Jesus fish’, a variety of African perch, so called because of its reputation as a prolific breeder. The Jacana is also known locally as the ‘Jesus bird,’ as it gives the impression of walking on water when it wades among the floating leaves of aquatic plants.

Lacovia and Middle Quarters are located between the Upper Morass and the Lower Morass. Middle Quarters is famous for its crayfish, known locally as ‘hot pepper shrimps.’ The traps used by the fishermen are similar to those of the Niger River in Africa; knowledge of their making was brought to the island by slaves over 300 years ago.

The Lower Morass consists of shallow estuaries, marshland and mangrove swamps, providing a rich ecological environment for a broad range of fish, birds and other creatures including lobsters, mangrove snappers, snook and mullet. Here the river is joined by the YS river making the Lower Morass the largest (14,085 acres) swamp environment in the Caribbean. American crocodiles (Crocodylus acutus) inhabit the swamps, but the population has declined, due mainly to loss of habitat as heavy draining for agricultural or tourist destroys their nesting places. Birds found here include egrets, herons and ospreys. The mangrove trees of the Lower Morass are sometimes spectacular with aerial roots sent out like spiders' legs, sometimes dropping 40 feet into the river.

The river reaches the sea on the eastern edge of the town of the same name.

Commercial use 
Logwood tree trunks were floated down the Black River to the port to be shipped to England for making of dyes.

Nowadays, motor boats take tourists on excursions from Black River town into the lower reaches.

References 

Rivers of Jamaica
Geography of Saint Elizabeth Parish
Ramsar sites in Jamaica